SS Petrella was a German merchant ship, which was torpedoed and sunk on 8 February 1944, north of Souda Bay, Crete, killing some 2,670 of the Italian POWs aboard.

Service history
The ship was built under the name Pasteur as a cargo liner, one of a class of nine ships ordered by the French government to replenish its merchant fleet after the losses of World War I. The ship was launched on 3 February 1923 from the Ateliers et Chantiers de la Gironde shipyard at Graville, Le Havre. On 11 July she was sold to the Plisson et Cie company of Bayonne, entering service on 10 August 1923. The following year she was sold to the Cie des Chargeurs Français, and in 1925 was chartered to the Compagnie Navale de l'Océanie shipping line, a subsidiary of the Ballande & Fils group, for service to New Caledonia. In June 1928 the ship was bought by the Compagnie Générale d'Armement Maritime (CGAM) and renamed Aveyron. She was operated by the Compagnie Générale Transatlantique (CGT) company, and was finally transferred to the ownership of CGT in 1939.
 
On 10 July 1941, following the French armistice the ship was transferred to the ownership of the Italian Government, and renamed Capo Pino was operated by the  Cia Genovese di Navigazione à Vapore, based at Genoa.
   
The ship was captured by the Germans at Patras, Greece, on 8 September 1943, following the announcement of the Italian capitulation.

Sinking
Crete had been captured by the Germans in May/June 1941, and was occupied by a mixed German-Italian force as "Fortress Crete". The Italian 51st Infantry Division Siena consisted of some 21,700 men, and occupied the easternmost prefecture of Lasithi. Following the armistice of September 1943 the Italians in Crete were disarmed by the Germans without major problems. As elsewhere, they were given the choice to continue the war alongside Germany, or to be sent to the Reich as military internees to perform forced labour. A minority chose to continue the fight and formed the Legione Italiana Volontari Creta.

As ordered by Adolf Hitler, the Italian internees were transported back to Germany. On 8 February 1944, some 3,173 prisoners were crammed into the hull of the Petrella. The ship was detected by the Royal Navy submarine  and torpedoed, despite the Petrella having been clearly marked as a prisoner of war transport. Some 2,670 prisoners died when the ship sank; a factor in the high death toll was that the guards did not open the holds where the POWs were and fired on those trying to get out.

See also 
 MS Sinfra
 SS Oria
 Sinking of the SS Tanais
 List by death toll of ships sunk by submarines

References

 

1923 ships
Ships built in France
Ships of the Compagnie Générale Transatlantique
World War II merchant ships of Germany
Maritime disasters
Maritime incidents in February 1944
Ships sunk by British submarines
World War II shipwrecks in the Aegean Sea
Captured ships